is a former Japanese football player.

Club statistics

References

External links

1980 births
Living people
Teikyo University alumni
Association football people from Saitama Prefecture
Japanese footballers
J1 League players
J2 League players
Ventforet Kofu players
Ehime FC players
Tochigi City FC players
Association football defenders